Ernst Starhemberg may refer to:

 Count Ernst Rüdiger von Starhemberg (1638–1701), army commander of Vienna during the second siege of Vienna, imperial general during the Great Turkish War and President of the Hofkriegsrat
 Ernst Rüdiger Starhemberg (1899–1956), Austrian nationalist politician